Club de Fútbol Rayo Majadahonda is a Spanish football team based in Majadahonda, in the autonomous community of Madrid. Founded in 1976 it plays in Primera División RFEF – Group 1, holding home games at Estadio Cerro del Espino, with a capacity of 3,800 seats.

History

Rayo Majadahonda was founded in 1976, being immediately registered in the Madrid Football Federation. It played in the regional divisions until 1987 when it achieved promotion to Tercera División. The club entered this new period with the new president Enrique Vedia, starting from June 30, 1987.

The club established themselves in the fourth division until the 1996–97 campaign, when it achieved a first-ever promotion to Segunda División B. Two consecutive relegations followed, but the club immediately regained their national status in 2000. Then, it subsequently remained in the fourth level until 2015 (only split by a one-season spell in the third division), when it achieved promotion with club legend Antonio Iriondo as manager.

On 27 May 2018, Rayo Majadahonda promoted for the first time ever to Segunda División by beating FC Cartagena with a last-minute own goal from Míchel Zabaco, with Iriondo still in charge of the first team. A year later, after suffering instant relegation, he resigned. In the second tier, the club played its home games at Atlético Madrid's Wanda Metropolitano due to the insufficient facilities at the Estadio Cerro del Espino.

As part of the conditions of playing in the fully professional second division, Rayo Majadahonda had a year to establish a Sociedad Anónima Deportiva, an form of public limited company that all its teams must be. The initial majority shareholder in September 2019 was Alejandro Arribas, a player formed at the club who was still playing professionally for Real Oviedo at the time.

Also in September, 2019 José María Sanz became club's new president.

Season to season

1 season in Segunda División
2 seasons in Primera División RFEF
7 seasons in Segunda División B
25 seasons in Tercera División

Current squad
.

Reserve team

Out on loan

Current technical staff

Notable players
Note: This list contains players that have played at least 100 league games and/or have reached international status.
 Lucas Mugni
 Lucas Hernandez (youth)
 Theo Hernandez (youth)
 Marcos Llorente (youth)
 Giovanni Simeone (youth)
 Asen
 Dani García
 Munir (youth)
 Rodri (youth)
 Jorge de Frutos

Notable coaches
 Antonio Iriondo
 Manolo

Reserve team

Founded in 1997, Rayo Majdahonda's reserve team started playing in the Regional Preferente (fifth tier) from 2000 to 2010. It was dissolved in 2011, after a third position in the Primera Regional.

On 4 July 2018, the club reached an agreement with CDF Tres Cantos to become its reserve team. The deal ended in April 2020, when the club announced a link with Alcobendas Sport; the club was renamed CD Paracuellos Antamira.

References

External links
Official website  
Futbolme team profile 
Unofficial website 

 
Football clubs in the Community of Madrid
Association football clubs established in 1976
1976 establishments in Spain
Segunda División clubs
Primera Federación clubs
Majadahonda